East Butler Public Schools  is a public school district in Butler County, Nebraska, United States.

Schools
The East Butler Public Schools School District has one elementary school and one high school.

Elementary schools
East Butler Elementary School

High school
East Butler High School

References

External links
 

School districts in Nebraska
Education in Butler County, Nebraska